Bilaspur Assembly constituency is one of the 403 constituencies of the Uttar Pradesh Legislative Assembly, India. It is a part of the Rampur district and one of the five assembly constituencies in the Rampur Lok Sabha constituency. First election in this assembly constituency was held in 1967 after the delimitation order (DPACO - 1964) was passed in 1964. The constituency was assigned identification number 36 after "Delimitation of Parliamentary and Assembly Constituencies Order, 2008" was passed in the year 2008.

Wards / Areas
Extent of Bilaspur Assembly constituency is Bilaspur Tehsil; Sihari, PCs Nagla Udai, Shyampur, Khata Kalan, Dhanaili Uttri, Pashupura of Milak KC of Milak Tehsil.

Members of the Legislative Assembly

Election results

2022

2017

2012
17 th Vidhan Sabha: 2012 General Elections

See also
Government of Uttar Pradesh
List of Vidhan Sabha constituencies of Uttar Pradesh
Rampur district
Rampur Lok Sabha constituency
Sixteenth Legislative Assembly of Uttar Pradesh
Uttar Pradesh
Uttar Pradesh Legislative Assembly

References

External links
 

Assembly constituencies of Uttar Pradesh
Rampur district
Constituencies established in 1964
1964 establishments in Uttar Pradesh